Recurvaria nanella, the lesser bud moth, is a moth of the family Gelechiidae. It is widely distributed in Europe and is also found in Turkey, the Near East, North Africa (including Egypt), the Caucasus, Transcaucasia, Kazakhstan and south-eastern Siberia. It is also found in North America, where it is probably introduced.

The wingspan is 10–12 mm. Adults are on wing from July to August.

The larvae feed on Amelanchier, Chaenomeles, Cotoneaster, Crataegus laevigata, Crataegus monogyna, Cydonia oblonga, Malus domestica, Malus ringo, Malus sylvestris, Mespilus germanica, Prunus armeniaca, Prunus avium, Prunus cerasus, Prunus domestica, (including subspecies insititia), Prunus dulcis, Prunus mahaleb, Prunus persica, Prunus spinosa, Pyrus communis and Sorbus. Young larvae mine the leaves of their host plant. The mine has the form of a branched or stellate, brownish corridor that contains almost no frass. After overwintering, the larvae live freely in the buds and amongst young leaves. Mining larvae can be found from August to October. The larvae have a reddish-brown body and a black head.

References

Moths described in 1775
Recurvaria
Moths of Europe
Moths of Asia
Moths of Africa